This Law of Ours and Other Essays is a book written by Muhammad Asad, first published by Dar al-Andalus, Gibraltar in 1987.  The book is a collection of Asad's writings, lectures and radio broadcasts—some written as far back as the 1940s—which aims to clarify some of the confusion in the Muslim Ummah about the scope and practical implications of Islamic law.

The book's preface was written by Pola Hamida, Asad's wife, who first gathered his writings and radio talks and persuaded him to publish a book.  In the preface, Hamida points out that the reader will be struck "not only by the extraordinary timeliness and timelessness of these thoughts and predictions, but also by their great consistency."

Argument 

Asad points out what is incumbent on a Muslim: namely, belief in the "Oneness of God" — indivisible in His existence, unattainable by human thought, all-embracing in His wisdom and power — and in the apostleship of Muhammad.

A large portion of the book elaborates on Islamic and western civilization and Muslim law. In particular, it deals with the role of ijtihad and the creative outlook of Muhammad's companions and the great jurists of the past, on the necessity for independent thinking grounded in the Qur'an and the Sunnah of Muhammad. It also contains the author's perspective on the ideological basis of Pakistan as well as on Islam's encounter with the west.

Table of contents
The essays contained in the book represent Asad's work and thought from the mid-1940s to 1987.  The following essays are included:

 This Law Of Ours
 Prolegomena
 A Time of Change
 Talking of Muslim Revival
 Whose is The Fault? 
 A New Approach
 The Basis of our Civilization
 Islamic Civilization and Islamic Law
 Discussing a Proposition
 The Companions and the Law
 A New Development
 Imitation of Thought
 A Voice from Nine Hundred Years Ago
 Creative Acceptance
 Summing Up

 What Do We Mean By Pakistan
 Looking at Ourselves
 The Uniqueness Of Pakistan
 Evasion and Self-deception
 The Choice Before Us
 The Time for a Decision
 Our Moral Stature

 Calling All Muslims
 The Encounter of Islam and the West
 Islam and the Spirit of Our Times
 The Answers of Islam
 Jerusalem: The Open City
 A Vision to Jerusalem
 The Meaning and Significance of the Hijrah
 The Message of the Quran

See also
 Timeline of Muhammad Asad's life
 The Message of The Qur'an
 The Road to Mecca
 The Principles of State and Government in Islam

References

1987 books
Sharia
Muhammad Asad